Sycamore is an unincorporated community in Sussex County, Delaware, United States. Sycamore is located at the intersection of Sycamore Road and Beaver Dam Branch Road, northeast of Laurel.

References

Unincorporated communities in Sussex County, Delaware
Unincorporated communities in Delaware